The Caudron C.61 was a French three-engined civil transport biplane aircraft built by the French aeroplane manufacturer Caudron. It was constructed of wood and covered in fabric.

Development
The prototype C.61 (F-ESAE) had a freight hold and cabin for six passengers.  The conventional landing gear also included a wheel beneath the nose to prevent nose-overs on landing.  For the production C.61s the cabin size was increased to accommodate eight passengers.

Operational history
In 1923, six C.61s were bought by Compagnie Franco-Roumaine de Navigation Aérienne to run between Bucharest and Belgrade.

Variants
C.61 Initial production variant.
C.811923 trimotor airliner
C.831924 Unbuilt trimotor project
C.1831923 trimotor airliner

Operators
Compagnie Franco-Roumaine de Navigation Aérienne/*Compagnie Internationale de Navigation Aérienne

Specifications (C.61)

Accidents
after 1923 (date unknown) - C.61 lost when it came down at sea
July 3, 1926 - C.61 operated by Compagnie Internationale de Navigation Aérienne crashes in Czechoslovakia

References

Citations

Bibliography
 

 

1920s French airliners
C.061
Biplanes
Trimotors